Vugha or Vuga  (Mji wa kale wa Vuga in Swahili ) is  historic village located inside Bumbuli District of Tanga Region in Tanzania. The settlement was established as the capital of the Kilindi dynasty.

See also
Kilindi dynasty

References

Further reading
 
 
 
 
 
 

Tanga Region